Shaun Christopher Addinall (born 27 September 1969) is a South African international lawn bowler.

Addinall won a bronze medal in the pairs with bowls partner Gerry Baker at the 2002 Commonwealth Games. He competed in the 2006 Commonwealth Games before winning a gold medal with Baker in the 2010 Commonwealth Games – Men's pairs.

References

External links
  (2002–2010)
 

1969 births
Living people
South African male bowls players
Commonwealth Games medallists in lawn bowls
Commonwealth Games gold medallists for South Africa
Commonwealth Games bronze medallists for South Africa
Bowls players at the 2002 Commonwealth Games
Bowls players at the 2006 Commonwealth Games
Bowls players at the 2010 Commonwealth Games
Medallists at the 2002 Commonwealth Games
Medallists at the 2010 Commonwealth Games